La novizia (The novice), is a 1975 Italian erotic comedy-drama film directed by Giuliano Biagetti (here credited as Pier Giorgio Ferretti).

Cast 
 Gloria Guida: Maria aka Sister Immacolata
 Gino Milli: Vittorio
 Lionel Stander: Don Ninì 
 Femi Benussi: Nuziatina
 Maria Pia Conte: Franca

References

External links

1975 films
1970s sex comedy films
Commedia sexy all'italiana
1970s Italian-language films
Films directed by Giuliano Biagetti
Films scored by Berto Pisano
1975 comedy films
1970s Italian films